Matt Williams (born 1960) is a rugby union coach, who is most prominent for having coached the Scotland men's national rugby union team between 2003 and 2005. Williams’ tenure as the Scotland coach is notable as having the worst win-ratio in Scotland’s history, winning only 3 of 17 matches, all against tier two nations. In addition, Williams has coached club sides in Australia, Ireland, and other parts of Europe. Today, Williams is also a radio and television pundit.

Playing career
Williams played from 1978 to 1992 with both Eastwood and Western Suburbs Rugby Clubs in Sydney, plus one season with Swansea in Wales.

Coaching

Williams started in coaching Western Suburbs U 20s in Sydney, Australia in 1992. A year later he became head coach of his former club Eastwood in Sydney in 1993, immediately taking them to the semifinals in both 1993 and 1994.  A major improvement from their lowly position when he arrived. Later that year he gained representative recognition when he was appointed fitness and skills coach for the Emerging Wallabies' tour of Zimbabwe, Namibia and South Africa.

In 1995 his coaching stints included New South Wales A, New South Wales Sevens, and as assistant coach for an Australian XV against England A. He was also a coaching assistant at the Wallaby World Cup camps.

He also coached the Balmain Tigers 7s team in the Coca-Cola World Sevens in Sydney, winning the Cup. Williams, a lifelong "Balmain Tigers man" said it was "one of the best experiences of his life."

In 1996 he became manager and assistant coach for the NSW Waratahs Super 12 campaign. For the next three years he was Head Coach for the NSW Waratahs.

Williams claims he was "instrumental" in mentoring and coaching such great players as Chris Whitaker, David Campese, Matt Burke, Tiaan Strauss, Phil Kearns and Jason Little.

Ireland
In the autumn of 1999, he acted as backs coach in Leinster Rugby's European Cup campaign, a prelude to becoming the province's head coach in 2000. Williams also undertook the role of defensive coach for the Irish national team in 2001. He was the first Australian Super 12 Coach to move to Europe.

Williams said that in the three years at Leinster he "was part of a great group of men" who rose through the European rankings from thirty-five to second. Leinster won the inaugural Celtic League Final and were semi-finalists of the European Cup.

Williams coached the former British and Irish Lions Captain Brian O'Driscoll, as well as Gordon D'Arcy, Shane Horgan, Malcolm O'Kelly and Denis Hickie.

Williams also was appointed Head Coach of Ireland "A" in 2002-03 and won the Six Nations title with the "A" team.

Scotland
After success with Ireland A, Williams was reportedly "head hunted" by the SRU and, in 2003, he was appointed as the head coach of Scotland. Williams was only the second Australian in over a century to be appointed as a head coach in the Six Nations Championship - and the Scottish national men's team's first foreign coach.

Scotland won three games out of 17 under William’s tenure - against the Tier 2 nations Japan and Samoa in 2004, and against Italy in the 2005 Six Nations. Williams controversially discarded Townsend - a celebrated figure in Scottish rugby, then aged only 30 - a week prior to the unveiling of his first national squad, despite an admission that his team lacked experienced centres.

After his role as Scotland coach, Williams was sacked as Scotland head coach in April 2005 having the worst win percentage of any Scottish permanent head coach, with Scotland's results immediately picking up with the arrival of new coach Frank Hadden, a former schoolteacher.

Later career

After his Scotland tenure, Williams returned to Australia and became head coach of West Harbour rugby club in Sydney from 2006 to 2007 before returning to Ireland to take over a very troubled Ulster team mid-season, after they had sacked former coach Mark McCall. Ulster were last in the Magners League and in danger of missing out on the ERC. Williams got Ulster off the bottom of the ladder and into the next European season. In his autobiography, Man and Ball, Stephen Ferris is extremely critical of Williams abilities (or lack thereof) as a coach. Ferris surmises that the talent within the Ulster squad was the principal reason for whatever success they had. Williams’ ineptitude was the principal reason for their failings.

Thankfully Williams then resigned from the post of Head Coach at Ulster Rugby in May 2009.

In 2010 he led a group of Australian businessmen in taking over the famous Club Narbonne Méditerranée, in France. Williams held three roles within the club. Director Sportif, Head Coach and General Manager. After two years Williams was in deep disagreement with Australian owners, who he felt were not taking the club in the direction that was best for the club's future. He resigned in July 2012. Williams has since been proven correct in his beliefs, as Narbonne have had several horror years, culminating with the club being relegated to Federal 1 (French 3rd Division) and the Australians losing control of the club. Several of the young players he "mentored" at Narbonne have gone on to excellent playing careers in the Top 14, including Vincent Rattez who was Capped for France in 2020.

He then returned to Australia and in 2013 he set up the rugby programme at the Knox Sports Academy in Sydney. The academy results progressed quickly under his coaching, resulting in Knox winning the CAS in 2015 and 2016. The programme also produced several Australian Schoolboy players and Connor Watson who was contracted by the Sydney Roosters and now  is playing with the Newcastle Knights in the NRL, Lachlan Swinton who is contracted with the NSW Waratahs in Super Rugby and Nick Frost at the Brumbies.

Williams had a brief three-month stint, advising the Timișoara Saracensclub in Romania, however, the club was paralysed with financial difficulties, and he left in November 2017, with the club leading their pool of the EPCR.

Media
Since 2007 Williams has worked extensively in the Irish media. He is the International Rugby guest writer with The Irish Times for all international matches. He is a guest commentator on Today FM's Matt Coopers, Last Word, Newstalk's Off the Ball, and the Second Captains podcasts.

Williams has worked extensively on television. Working for the ABC in Australia on match analysis, then in Ireland with Setanata TV, TV3 and its successor channel, Virgin Media One. .

Coaching statistics: Scotland (2003–05)

International matches as head coach

Record by country

References

1960 births
Living people
Australian rugby union coaches
Leinster Rugby non-playing staff
Scotland national rugby union team coaches
Ulster Rugby non-playing staff
Australian expatriate sportspeople in Ireland
Australian expatriate sportspeople in Romania
Australian expatriate sportspeople in Scotland
Australian expatriate sportspeople in Northern Ireland
Australian expatriate sportspeople in Wales
Australian rugby union players
Australian expatriate rugby union players
Expatriate rugby union players in Wales
Australian expatriate sportspeople in France
Rugby union players from Sydney
University of Sydney alumni